Ádám Kisznyér (born 10 February 1988) is a Hungarian footballer who played as a striker for Újpest FC until March 2009. Because of a serious injury on the head he retired.

Career 
Kisznyér started to play football at the age of seven at Újpest. He stayed in the youth team, then went to Vasas SC for a half-year, later that he joined MTK. He played in MTK between 2001 and 2004. His first NB I match with the team was against Bp. Honvéd in February 2007.

References 

Living people
1988 births
Hungarian footballers
Újpest FC players
Association football forwards